Elizabeth Solopova is a Russian-British philologist and medievalist undertaking research at New College, Oxford. She is known outside academic circles for her work on J. R. R. Tolkien's Middle-earth writings.

Life 

Elizabeth Solopova was born in Russia and graduated from Moscow State University. She completed her PhD in English at the University of Oxford.
She is a research fellow at the University of Oxford, where she teaches Old and Middle English.

Reception

The Keys of Middle-Earth 

Solopova's 2005 book The Keys of Middle-Earth, written with Stuart D. Lee, on Tolkien's medieval sources for his fantasy writings, was warmly received by scholars, though they found some issues with it. It is her most-cited work. It has been described as an excellent introduction, both for students to use as a text and as a resource for instructors, and an interesting sidelight on the linguistic issues that so fascinated Tolkien. Scholars have praised it as a well-chosen selection of texts and a well-researched introduction to both Tolkien's career and the study of medieval languages. Others have noted that it excludes The Silmarillion, which would have demanded the Finnish Kalevala. As a student text, its medieval fragments are well-introduced but too short for most academic purposes.

Key Concepts in Medieval Literature 

Solopova's 2007 book Key Concepts in Medieval Literature, also written with Stuart D. Lee, has been praised as a scholarly introduction with essays at a level suitable for undergraduates and helpful recommendations for further reading. The literature is however exclusively English.

Books 

She has written or edited the following books:

 2000 Chaucer: The General Prologue
 2005 The Keys of Middle-Earth: Discovering Medieval Literature through the Fiction of J. R. R. Tolkien
 2009 Languages, Myths and History: An Introduction to the Linguistic and Literary Background of J. R. R. Tolkien's Fiction
 2007 Key Concepts in Medieval Literature
 2015 Latin Liturgical Psalters in the Bodleian Library: A Select Catalogue – a catalogue of 111 liturgical psalters from the Bodleian Library, with details of bookbinding, decoration, and text.
 2016 The Wycliffite Bible: Origin, History and Interpretation
 2020 From the Vulgate to the Vernacular: Four Debates on an English Question c. 1450 (editor, with J. Catto and A. Hudson)

References

External links
 

British philologists
Women philologists
Living people
Fellows of New College, Oxford
Writers from Moscow
1965 births
Tolkien studies